Ekaterina Alexeyevna Davydova (born 17 September 1978) is a Russian former competitive ice dancer. She is the 1996 World Junior champion with Roman Kostomarov. She also skated with Vazgen Azroyan.

Competitive highlights 
GP: Part of Champions Series (renamed Grand Prix in 1998)

With Kostomarov

With Azrojan

References

Navigation

Russian female ice dancers
Living people
World Junior Figure Skating Championships medalists
1978 births
Figure skaters from Moscow
Competitors at the 1997 Winter Universiade